Xylodromus a genus of beetles in the family Staphylinidae, subfamily Omaliinae.

List of species
Xylodromus affinis (Gerhardt, 1877)
Xylodromus brunneipennis (Stephens, 1832)
Xylodromus concinnus (Marsham, 1802)
Xylodromus depressus (Gravenhorst, 1802)
Xylodromus sassuchini (Kirshenblat, 1936)
Xylodromus testaceus (Erichson, 1840)
Xylodromus uralensis (Kirshenblat, 1936)

References

 BioLab - Xylodromus
 zipcodezoo.com - Omaliinae (Subfamily)

Staphylinidae genera
Omaliinae